Volhard is a surname. Notable people with the surname include:

Franz Volhard (1872–1950), German internist
Christiane Nüsslein-Volhard (born 1942), German biologist and the Nobel Laureate
Jacob Volhard  (1834–1910), German chemist

See also
Volkhart